Rebild National Park (Danish: Rebild Bakker) is a protected area located in Rebild municipality in Region Nordjylland in Denmark.

The park comprises a hilly heathland south of the small town of Rebild, situated in the geographic region of the Himmerland on the peninsula of Jutland. The forest of Rold Skov surrounds the hills on three sides, but the heathland is to be protected in its natural state. The Rebild Festival is held in the national park every 4 July.

Rebild National Park is not included in the Danish National Park laws of 2007, but the heath is still to be protected and it can use the name National Park nonetheless. The park is one of two original national parks in Denmark, the other one being 'National Park Dybbøl Skanser' from 1924, now called 'Historiecenter Dybbøl Banke' (English: Dybbøl Banke Museum and History Centre).

Rebild Bakker houses a number of museums.

History 
The heaths of Rebild Hills (Danish: Rebild Bakker) was previously owned and used by the local peasants as pastures for their cattle, but it was bought up in the year 1911 and presented as a gift to the state of Denmark, to be administered on certain conditions (stipulations).

The founder of the Rebild National Park was Dr. Max Henius, a Danish-American who emigrated to the United States in 1881 and settled in Chicago. In 1911, almost  of the hilly countryside were bought with funds raised by Danish Americans. One of the Chicago-based Danish Americans included Jens Peder Poulsen Fuglsang, born in Virring Denmark in 1871. In 1912, Max Henius (accompanied by Fuglsang, whose name in Danish means "birdsong") presented the deed to the land to his Majesty King Christian X as a permanent memorial to Danish Americans. Sadly, Fuglsang died at sea aboard the ocean liner SS Oscar II on his return trip to America in August 1912.   Later the Danish government added to the land, that now features a beautiful natural park.

The first Rebild Festival took place in 1912, when King Christian X spoke to a crowd of 10,000. The day has been celebrated every year since then, with the exception of the periods during World War I and World War II. American sculptor Georg J. Lober created an emblem for the Danish National Park in Rebild in 1912 and also made a bronze relief of U.S. president Abraham Lincoln located in Rebild Park.

In 1925, Mindeparken was inaugurated in the city of Aarhus by King Christian X and it was planned to celebrate the Danish-American gatherings as well as visiting Danish citizens living abroad there. As the Rebild Festival gained momentum, Mindeparken was dropped and used for other purposes.

Stipulations 
The park was given to the Danish state, as a present with three conditions:
That the area should remain in a natural state
That it would be open to the public
That Danish-Americans could celebrate American holidays at the park.

Current activities 
Rebild National Park is the site of what is commonly believed to be the largest annual 4th of July celebration held outside the United States. Since 1912, The Rebild National Park Society Inc., a Danish-American friendship organization, has held a 4 July weekend festival that serves as a homecoming for Danish-Americans. This has helped make Rebild Park one of Denmark's major tourist attractions.

The Rebild Festival traditionally features the hoisting of the U.S. and Danish flags while the two countries' national anthems echo in the surrounding hills. The annual Fourth of July celebration was the subject of the television documentary Rebildfest 1990, which featured actor Richard Chamberlain.

Rebild National Park also houses an annual Christmas market on Advent Sunday with around 5,000 visitors.

References

Other Sources 
 Rebild Bakker Himmerland Danish Nature Agency.
 The springs in Rebild Bakker Naturturist Nordjylland 
 VisitRebild

External links 

 Rebild National Park Society the US site.
 Rebildcentret English available.
 Rebild Bakker og Gravlev Ådal pdf-Maps. Danish Nature Agency.
 Rebild Bakker 
 Rebild Bakker images

Rebild Municipality
1912 establishments in Denmark
Protected areas established in 1912
National parks of Denmark
Geography of Denmark
Heaths
Tourist attractions in the North Jutland Region